Guillermo Durán and Andrés Molteni won the title, beating Gastão Elias and Fabrício Neis 6–3, 6–4

Seeds

Draw

Draw

References
 Main Draw

Challenger Ciudad de Guayaquil - Doubles